The 32d Medical Brigade is a medical brigade in the United States Army formed in 1940. The unit is a part of the United States Army Medical Department Center and School.

Structure
The following units are subordinate to the brigade:
232nd Medical Battalion
264th Medical Battalion

Lineage
Organized 1 June 1940 in the Regular Army at Carlisle Barracks, Pennsylvania, as Provisional Medical Battalion, The Medical Field Service School

Consolidated 11 August 1940 with the 32d Medical Battalion (concurrently constituted in the Regular Army), and consolidated unit designated as the 32d Medical Battalion

Inactivated 30 April 1948 at Fort Sam Houston, Texas

Redesignated 19 August 1992 as the 132d Medical Battalion

Headquarters, 132d Medical Battalion, redesignated 1 October 2002 as Headquarters and Headquarters Company, 32d Medical Brigade (remainder of the battalion disbanded); concurrently transferred to the United States Army Medical Command and activated at Fort Sam Houston, Texas

Decorations
Meritorious Unit Commendation (Army) for AMERICAN THEATER

References

External links
Home page

032
Military units and formations established in 1940